Bob Hannah is a retired college baseball coach who served as head coach of the Delaware Fightin' Blue Hens baseball team from 1965–2000.

Playing career
Hannah played basketball and baseball at Wesley College in Dover, Delaware in the 1950s.

Coaching career
During his tenure, he was one of the most successful intercollegiate baseball coaches in the country, producing over 1,000 wins in a 35-year career. Hannah's baseball teams have had many successful season including eight straight 30 win seasons from 1976–1983 and five straight 40 win seasons from 1994–1998. Hannah has coached many Major League Baseball players including pitcher Steve Taylor who was a No. 1 draft pick of the New York Yankees in 1977. In 2000, the Delaware Baseball Stadium was renamed Bob Hannah Stadium in his honor.

Hannah was named America East Coach of the Year five times, a conference record.

References

Year of birth missing (living people)
Living people
Delaware Fightin' Blue Hens baseball coaches
Baseball players from Trenton, New Jersey
University of Delaware alumni
Wesley Wolverines baseball players
Wesley Wolverines men's basketball players